The 2022 Liga Sudamericana de Básquetbol was the 25th season of the Liga Sudamericana de Básquetbol (LSB), the second tier of basketball in South America organised by FIBA Americas. It was the first edition since the 2019 season, after the league had a 3-year hiatus due to the COVID-19 pandemic. The season began 30 September 2022 and ended on 4 December 2022 with the Grand Final. The quarter-finals, semi-finals and Grand Final were all hosted in Buenos Aires.

Botafogo was the defending champion, having won the 2019 title, but did not qualify for this season. Bauru won its second LSB championship after defeating San Martín in the Grand Final.

Team allocation 
The following teams have been confirmed for the upcoming season:

 1st, 2nd, etc.: Position in national league
 WC: Wild card

Group stage

Group A
The games of Group A were played from 30 September to 2 October 2022 in Barranquilla, Colombia.

Group B
The games of Group B were played from 7 October to 9 October 2022 in Oberá, Argentina.

Group C
The games of Group C were played from 13 October to 15 October 2022 in Buenos Aires, Argentina.

Group D
The games of Group D were played from 21 October to 24 October in Campina Grande, Brazil.

Quarterfinals
The eight teams that advanced from the group stage will be paired according to their records.

All times are local (GMT-3)

Bracket

 indicates a team qualified for the Final Four.

First round

Second round

Third round

Final Four

Bracket

Semifinals

Third place game

Grand Final

Individual awards 
The winners of the individual awards were announced after the Grand Final on 4 December.

MVP 

  Danilo Fuzaro (Bauru)

All-Tournament Team 

 G  Danilo Fuzaro (Bauru)
 G  Santiago Ferreyra (San Martín)
 F  Gemerson Silva (Bauru)
 F  Ernesto Oglivie (Titanes de Barranquilla)
 C  Charles Mitchell (Obéra)

References 

Liga Sudamericana de Básquetbol seasons
2022–23 in South American basketball